Rineloricaria cadeae, sometimes known as the Cadéa whiptail catfish, is a species of catfish in the family Loricariidae. It is native to South America, where it is known from Brazil and Uruguay, including the Lagoa dos Patos drainage basin and the Cadeia River, for which it is named. It is typically found in areas with flowing water of variable speed and turbidity, with a variety of substrates also being reported as habitat for the species. Adult individuals of the species are frequently found in sandy areas, whereas juveniles are believed to prefer the leaves of marginal vegetation. The species reaches 12.8 cm (5 inches) in standard length and is believed to be a facultative air-breather.

References 

Fish described in 1868
Catfish of South America
Loricariidae